Sallee Snowfield is a large snowfield between Dufek Massif and northern Forrestal Range in the Pensacola Mountains in Antarctica. Mapped by United States Geological Survey (USGS) from surveys and U.S. Navy air photos, 1956–66. Named by Advisory Committee on Antarctic Names (US-ACAN) for Lieutenant Commander Ralph W. Sallee, Asst. Meteorological Officer on the staff of the Commander, U.S. Naval Support Force, Antarctica, in 1967 and 1968.

Snow fields of Antarctica
Bodies of ice of Queen Elizabeth Land